A billet is the place where a person is assigned to sleep.

Billet may also refer to:
 Billet (semi-finished product), a semi-finished cast or rolled metal product
 Billet (tack), the straps on an English saddle to which the girth is buckled
 Bar stock or billet, in metalworking, a semi-finished product which is usually milled or lathed into a more finished product
 Billet (wood), a piece of timber prepared to be split
 Billet (heraldry), a rectangular charge (shape) on a coat of arms

People with the surname
Julia Billet (born 1962), French author and poet

See also
Billet-doux
Billets (film)
Ballet (disambiguation)
 Bellet
 Bullet